Alfa TV was a former pay television service available in Cyprus, that broadcast sports and children's programming as well as the odd film. It was owned by Alfa TV Ltd. and was launched in 1998. Alfa TV was one of only 2 pay-TV services in Cyprus, the other being Lumiere TV with whom Alfa TV had a programming agreement. Some of the programs on Alfa TV were broadcast incorporation with well-known pay-TV channels, and specifically with those of MultiChoice (CineMagic, SuperSport and K-T.V.).

It was broadcast over the air, together with Lumiere TV, on several platforms, like CytaVision, with an extra fee. Repeaters had been set up across the country that enabled more than 80% of the population to receive those services. Alfa TV was available on the Nova Cyprus platform but due to a financial dispute with the provider, the channel was removed and signed on with rival Athina Sat in July 2006. It was also available through IPTV providers CytaVision & PrimeTel.

As of March 3, 2008, Alfa TV returned to NOVA Cyprus following a new agreement whilst Athina Sat, had ceased operations. During the summer of 2011, the channel, was expected to be renamed to STAR Channel. The owner and former member of the parliament, Sokratis Chasikos, hired the former head manager of ANT1 Cyprus, Giorgos Tsalakos, as head manager. The contract with LTV ended in May and was not renewed.

Former Programming

Sports
Alfa TV featured sports programming from Cyprus and around the world, as some of them were broadcast in corporation with SuperSport. Sports coverage included live action from NBA, WNBA, UEFA Champions League, UEFA Europa League, WWE Bottom Line, World Rally Championship, NASCAR and Champ Car World Series. In addition, Alfa TV had extensive coverage of championship football including matches from the following leagues: Super League, Premier League, Serie A, German Bundesliga and Portuguese Primeira Liga. Alfa TV also covered other events such as horse racing from the Nicosia Racing Club, tennis, boxing, bowling, billiards, rodeo, golf and extreme sports. Shows regarding sports would include:

Antistrofi Metrisi - Sports talk show, aired Tuesdays at 8:45 pm, around an hour before a UEFA Champions League match would start. (2003-)
Fair Play - Sports talk show about Superleague Greece, aired Tuesdays at 9 pm.
Kalispera Evropi - Sports talk show, aired Wednesdays at 8:45 pm, around an hour before a UEFA Champions League match would start. (2003-)
Alfa Sports - Sport newscast, aired Thursdays at 9 pm. Presented by Gregory Georgiou, and Thomas Franzis.
Athlitikes Istories kai oxi mono, Diasimon Anthropon - Sports talk show featuring important people associated with sports, aired Thursdays at 10 pm.
Roda einai... kai gyrizei ston Alfa - Sports talk show centred around motorcycles, aired Fridays at 10 pm. Presented by Stelios Vanezos. (2002-)
I Ora ton Protathliton - Sports talk show that would talk about each season of Superleague Greece, aired Sundays at 10 pm.

Children's

Initially, Alfa TV would broadcast children's programs incorporation with K-T.V. At a time the latter network would collapse, Kids TV, its spiritual successor, was formed. Independently managed, it would air Warner Bros. and Nickelodeon cartoons. Coincidentally, K-T.V. in South Africa would also air Nickelodeon programming.

Allegra's Window (Το Παράθυρο της Αλέγκρα)
All Grown Up! (Rugrats: Η Επόμενη Γενιά)
Animaniacs
As Told by Ginger (Το Ημερολόγιο της Τζίντζερ)
Avatar: The Last Airbender
Baby Looney Tunes
Back at the Barnyard (Στον Αχυρώνα)
Batman: The Animated Series (Μπάτμαν)
Batman: The Brave and the Bold
Ben 10
Blue's Clues (Τα Στοιχεία της Μπλου)
CatDog
ChalkZone
Clarissa Explains It All (Κλαρίσα)
Courage the Cowardly Dog (Γενναίος, ο Φοβητσιάρης Σκύλος)
Danny Phantom
Dora the Explorer
Drake & Josh
Eureeka's Castle (Το Κάστρο της Γιουρίκα)
Fanboy & Chum Chum
Hey Arnold!
iCarly
Just for Kicks
Justice League Unlimited
Kappa Mikey
Kenan & Kel
Legends of the Hidden Temple (Τα Μυστικά του Κρυμμένου Ναού)
Legion of Super-Heroes
Little Bill
Loonatics Unleashed
Max Adventures (Οι περιπέτειες του Μαξ)
My Life as a Teenage Robot (Τζένι: το Ρομπότ)
Nickelodeon Guts (Ατρόμητα Παιδιά)
Ni Hao, Kai-Lan
Noah Knows Best
Planet Sheen
Rocket Power
Rocko's Modern Life (Ο Κόσμος του Rocko)
Rugrats
Scooby-Doo, Where Are You!
SpongeBob SquarePants
Tak and the Power of Juju
The 13 Ghosts of Scooby-Doo (Ο Σκούμπι-Ντου και τα 13 Φαντάσματα)
The Adventures of Jimmy Neutron, Boy Genius
The Adventures of Pete & Pete (Οι Περιπέτειες των Πητ και Πητ)
The Amanda Show (Αμάντα)
The Angry Beavers (Οι Τρελοκάστορες)
The Brothers García (Τα Αδέλφια Γκαρσία)
The Cat&Birdy Warneroonie PinkyBrainy Big Cartoonie Show
The Fairly OddParents (Δύο Φανταστικοί Γονείς)
The Jetsons
The Lampies
The Mighty B! (Η Τρομερή Μπι)
The Penguins of Madagascar
The Road Runner Show
The Wild Thornberrys
The X's
Tiny Toon Adventures
Tom & Jerry Kids (Οι Μικρούληδες Τομ και Τζέρι)
Twipsy
Unfabulous (Το Τραγούδι της Άντυ)
Welcome Freshmen (Οι Πρωτοετείς)
Wonder Pets! (Σούπερ Ζωάκια)
Yakkity Yak

Other
In addition to the programming mentioned above, Alfa TV also aired several original programs of its own, throughout the week.
Deltio Eidiseon - Daily newscasts at 5 pm, 6 pm & 7 pm featuring all the top stories from Cyprus, Greece and the rest of the world.
Atzenta - Talkshow, aired Mondays at 7:10pm. Presented by Maria Sfetsou.
Ygeia - Talkshow about health topics, aired Tuesdays at 7:10 pm. Presented by Elena Papamichail.
Ston Fako tou Alfa - Talkshow, aired Tuesdays at 11 pm. Presented by Eleni Vretou.
En Dimo - Talkshow, aired Wednesdays at 7:10 pm. Presented by Maria Sfetsou.
Οikonomia - a business program that dealt with the top economic issues, aired Thursdays at 7:10 pm. Presented by Evelthon Iakovidis.
Politistiki Atzenta - Talkshow, aired Fridays at 6:30 pm. Presented by Maria Sfetsou.
Εpi Skinis - Current affairs program that was discussing the key issues affecting society, aired Tuesdays at 7:10 pm.
Μera Para Mera - Talkshow that dealt with various topics of discussion from politics to culture to current affairs, aired Wednesday and Friday at 7:10 pm.

References

Defunct television channels in Cyprus
Greek-language television stations
Television channels and stations established in 1998
Television channels and stations disestablished in 2015